Raphael Dias Belloli (born 14 December 1996), known as Raphinha, is a Brazilian professional footballer who plays as a winger for La Liga club Barcelona and the Brazil national team.

He began his career in with Avaí, but left for Portuguese side Vitória Guimarães in 2016, where he made his professional début. After impressive performances, he signed for Sporting CP, where he spent a year before signing for French club Rennes. After a year he was on the move again, signing for English club Leeds United, where he spent two years before transferring to Barcelona in a deal reportedly worth £50 million.

Having made his debut in October 2021, Raphinha is a Brazil international. His first two goals for the national team came in a win over Uruguay later that month. He was selected for Brazil's squad at the 2022 FIFA World Cup in Qatar.

Early life
Raphinha was born in Porto Alegre, Brazil where he grew up in Restinga, a favela far from the city centre. His father was a jobbing musician. He had a difficult upbringing where he describes sharing a bedroom with his parents, younger brother and pets; struggling to pay travel costs and at points having to beg for food. He is of Italian descent.

At the age of seven, he attended Ronaldinho's birthday party due to his father and uncle's relationship with the player. They have met numerous times since and have developed a lasting friendship.

Before starting his professional football career, Raphinha participated in the várzea tournaments until the age of 18, which he describes as "a network of independent matches and tournaments organised by the local community" below academy level in which any prospective player is allowed to participate. The matches in these tournaments are played under harsh conditions, including home fans harassing opponent team players near changing rooms before matches, gunshots, clay pitches with dust and sand, intense heat, posts instead of nets and shirtless teams due to the lack of bibs.

He has a long standing friendship with Bruno Fernandes, starting before they became teammates at Sporting CP. According to Raphinha, Fernandes has been a huge help to him and his footballing career. Before joining Leeds United, Fernandes told Raphinha that his style would "fit the league" (in reference to the Premier League).

Club career

Avaí
After unsuccessful trials with International and Grêmio, Raphinha started his career playing youth football with Imbituba, where he was later scouted by Avaí. At 18 years old, Raphinha started his career with the Avaí's under-20 team in the Campeonato Brasileiro Série A in 2014. After being injured, he was unable to make the squad but continued to train on his own. Despite growing interest in Raphinha from many of Brazil's top clubs, Avaí kept hold of him until 2016, where he impressed at the Copa São Paulo de Futebol Júnior.

Vitória Guimarães

On 2 February 2016, Raphinha signed for Portuguese side Vitória Guimarães, having been scouted at the Copa São Paulo de Futebol Júnior by Deco, who signed him to his agency, D20 Sports, and arranged his transfer to Vitória. He made his debut for the Vimaranenses on 13 March 2016 against Paços de Ferreira. He scored his first goal for the club against C.S. Marítimo on 20 August 2016. He made his first appearance in the 2017–18 UEFA Europa League on 14 September 2017 against Red Bull Salzburg. He won the Vitória Guimarães Breakthrough Player of the Year in 2017. He scored 18 goals during 43 games (in all competitions) during the 2017–18 Primeira Liga season for Vitória Guimarães.

Sporting CP
In May 2018, he transferred to Portuguese club Sporting CP until 2019. He made his debut on 12 August against Moreirense. He scored his first goal for the club on 20 September 2018 against FK Qarabag in the 2–0 victory in the 2018–19 UEFA Europa League. Raphinha was a part of the side that won the 2018–19 Taça de Portugal scoring a penalty in the penalty shootout victory against Porto.

Rennes
He signed for a French club Rennes in 2019, with a transfer fee around €21 million, the club's record signing. He scored and gained an assist in his final game for the club during the 2020–21 Ligue 1 fixture against Reims in a 2–2 draw on 4 October 2020. He scored eight goals and gained seven assists during his time at the club, where he helped Rennes to a third place finish and qualify for the 2020–21 UEFA Champions League during the 2019–20 Ligue 1 season.

Leeds United

2020–21 season
On 5 October 2020, he joined Leeds United on a four-year contract for an undisclosed fee reported to be in the region of £17 million, or about €20 million. On 19 October 2020, he made his debut as a second-half substitute in a 1–0 loss to Wolverhampton Wanderers. His full debut was at home to Arsenal on 22 November 2020. On 28 November 2020, Raphinha scored his first Leeds goal in a 1–0 away win over Everton. His winning goal secured Leeds' first ever Premier League win at Goodison Park and their first league win at Everton since 1990. He finished the season with six goals, all from league fixtures.

2021–22 season
Raphinha scored his first goal of the season on 21 August 2021, in Leeds' first home game, a low-struck 72nd-minute equaliser from just inside the penalty area, in a 2–2 result against Everton, which was nominated as one of the Premier League's Goals of the Month for August.

Raphinha ended the season as Leeds' top goalscorer with 11 goals, including the first goal of the game in the 2–1 away win against Brentford on the last day of the season, from the penalty spot after being fouled by the Brentford goalkeeper David Raya, confirming Leeds' Premier League status.

Barcelona
On 15 July 2022, Raphinha signed for La Liga club Barcelona on a five-year contract for a reported initial fee of £50m, potentially rising to £55 million in add-ons. On 13 August, he made his debut for the club in 0–0 draw against Rayo Vallecano in the league. On 3 September, he scored his first Barcelona goal in a 3–0 victory over Sevilla at the Ramón Sánchez Pizjuán.

International career
In August 2021, Raphinha was called up to represent Brazil for the team's World Cup qualifiers against Chile, Argentina and Peru.

On 7 October 2021, Raphinha made his full debut for the national side, coming on as a substitute at half time in a 3–1 comeback win against Venezuela. He assisted two goals and won a penalty in 45 minutes on the pitch, receiving praise from sports pundits and fans.

In his third appearance and first start, he scored his first two international goals in a qualifying match against Uruguay.

On 7 November 2022, Raphinha was named in the squad for the 2022 FIFA World Cup.

Career statistics

Club

International

Brazil score listed first, score column indicates score after each Raphinha goal

Honours
Sporting CP
Taça de Portugal: 2018–19
Taça da Liga: 2018–19

Barcelona
Supercopa de España: 2022–23

Individual
Vitória Guimarães Breakthrough Player of the Year: 2017

References

External links

 Profile at the FC Barcelona website
 

1996 births
Living people
Footballers from Porto Alegre
Brazilian footballers
Association football wingers
Avaí FC players
Vitória S.C. B players
Vitória S.C. players
Stade Rennais F.C. players
Sporting CP footballers
Leeds United F.C. players
FC Barcelona players
Primeira Liga players
Liga Portugal 2 players
Premier League players
La Liga players
2022 FIFA World Cup players
Brazil international footballers
Brazilian expatriate footballers
Expatriate footballers in England
Expatriate footballers in France
Expatriate footballers in Portugal
Expatriate footballers in Spain
Brazilian expatriate sportspeople in England
Brazilian expatriate sportspeople in France
Brazilian expatriate sportspeople in Portugal
Brazilian expatriate sportspeople in Spain
Brazilian people of Italian descent